From Headquarters is a 1933 American pre-Code murder mystery film starring George Brent, Margaret Lindsay and Eugene Pallette, and directed by William Dieterle.

Cast
 George Brent as Lieutenant J. Stevens
 Margaret Lindsay as Lou Ann Winton
 Eugene Pallette as Sergeant Boggs
 Robert Barrat as Anderzian
 Henry O'Neill as Inspector Donnelly
 Hugh Herbert as Manny Wales
 Dorothy Burgess as Dolly White
 Theodore Newton as Jack Winton
 Hobart Cavanaugh as Muggs Manton
 Ken Murray as Mac
 Murray Kinnell as Horton
 Edward Ellis as Dr. Van de Water
 Kenneth Thomson as Gordon Bates

Reception
The New York Times review was lukewarm, calling it "a tidbit for the hardier addicts of the mystery melodramas. Less specialized students of the cinema are likely to find in it only the mildest sort of entertainment." However, the reviewer did praise the cast as "uniformly pleasant".

According to Warner Bros records, the film earned $228,000 domestically and $110,000 foreign.

References

External links
 
 

American crime films
American mystery films
American black-and-white films
Films directed by William Dieterle
Warner Bros. films
1930s crime films
1930s mystery films
1930s American films